Deh-e Bid Pichab (also Romanized as Deh-e Bīd Pīchāb) is a village in Kuh Mareh Khami Rural District, in the Central District of Basht County, Kohgiluyeh and Boyer-Ahmad Province, Iran. At the 2006 census, its population was 20, in 6 families.

References 

Populated places in Basht County